Wilburgstetten is a municipality  in the district of Ansbach in Bavaria in Germany.

References

Ansbach (district)